Akabane may refer to:

Akabane virus
Akabane, a neighborhood in Kita, Tokyo
Akabane Station, a railway station in Kita, Tokyo, Japan
Akabane Line, a railway line in Tokyo, Japan

People with the surname
, Japanese voice actor
, better known as Little Tokyo, Japanese professional midget wrestler

Characters
, a character in the manga series Assassination Classroom
Aiger Akabane (赤刃アイガ/Akaba Aiga in Japanese), a character in the anime Beyblade Burst Turbo

Japanese-language surnames